Hamilton's optico-mechanical analogy is a concept of classical physics enunciated by William Rowan Hamilton. It may be viewed as linking Huygens' principle of optics with Jacobi's Principle of mechanics.

According to Cornelius Lanczos, the analogy has been important in the development of ideas in quantum physics. According to Erwin Schrödinger, for micromechanical motions, the Hamiltonian analogy of mechanics to optics is inadequate to treat diffraction, which requires it to be extended to a vibratory wave equation in configuration space.

Huygens' principle

The propagation of light can be considered in terms of rays and wavefronts in ordinary physical three-dimensional space. One may consider an inhomogeneous anisotropic medium with smoothly distributed properties that are described by an index of refraction that is a well-behaved function of position. Huygens' principle governs the propagation of a wavefront as it can be derived from Fermat's principle. The wavefronts are two-dimensional curved surfaces. The rays are one-dimensional curved lines.

Thus, a wave is a foliated set of moving two-dimensional surfaces. In classical physics, it is not part of the definition of a wave that it be distinctly vibratory.

One difference between wave and particle conceptions is thus in the spatial dimensionality of their moving objects.

On one hand, a ray can be regarded as the orbit of a particle of light. It successively punctures the wave surfaces. The successive punctures can be regarded as defining the trajectory of the particle.

On the other hand, a wave-front can be regarded as a level surface of displacement of some quantity, such as electric field intensity, hydrostatic pressure, particle number density, oscillatory phase, or probability amplitude. Then the physical meaning of the rays is less evident.

This is wave–particle duality for a single particle in ordinary three-dimensional physical space or for a wave of some property of a medium with a spatial distribution of properties that is mostly continuous but not homogeneous.

Extended Huygens' principle

Going beyond ordinary three-dimensional physical space, one can imagine a higher dimensional abstract configuration "space", with a dimension a multiple of 3. In this space, one can imagine again rays as one-dimensional curved lines. Now the wavefronts are hypersurfaces of dimension one less than the dimension of the space. Such a multi-dimensional space can serve as a configuration space for a multi-particle system.

Classical limit of the Schrödinger equation

Albert Messiah considers a classical limit of the Schrödinger equation. He finds there an optical analogy. The trajectories of his particles are orthogonal to the surfaces of equal phase. He writes "In the language of optics, the latter are the wave fronts, and the trajectories of the particles are the rays. Hence the classical approximation is equivalent to the geometric optics approximation: we find once again, as a consequence of the Schrödinger equation, the basic postulate of the theory of matter waves."

History

Hamilton's optico-mechanical analogy played a part in the thinking of Schrödinger, one of the originators of quantum mechanics. Section 1 of his paper published in December 1926 is titled "The Hamiltonian analogy between mechanics and optics". Section 1 of the first of his four lectures on wave mechanics delivered in 1928 is titled "Derivation of the fundamental idea of wave mechanics from Hamilton's analogy between ordinary mechanics and geometrical optics".

In a brief paper in 1923, de Broglie wrote : "Dynamics must undergo the same evolution that optics has undergone when undulations took the place of purely geometrical optics." In his 1924 thesis, though de Broglie did not name the optico-mechanical analogy, he wrote in his introduction "... a single principle, that of Maupertuis, and later in another form as Hamilton's Principle of least action ... Fermat's ... principle ..., which nowadays is usually called the principle of least action. ... Huygens propounded an undulatory theory of light, while Newton, calling on an analogy with the material point dynamics that he created, developed a corpuscular theory, the so-called "emission theory", which enabled him even to explain, albeit with a contrived hypothesis, effects nowadays considered wave effects, (i.e., Newton's rings)."

In the opinion of Léon Rosenfeld, a close colleague of Niels Bohr, "... Schrödinger [was] inspired by Hamilton's beautiful comparison of classical mechanics and geometrical optics ..."

The first textbook in English on wave mechanics devotes the second of its two chapters to "Wave mechanics in relation to ordinary mechanics". It opines "... de Broglie and Schrödinger have turned this false analogy into a true one by using the natural Unit or Measure of Action, .... ...  We must now go into Hamilton's theory in more detail, for when once its true meaning is grasped the step to wave mechanics  is but a short one—indeed now, after the event, almost seems to suggest itself."

According to one textbook, "The first part of our problem, namely, the establishment of a system of first-order equations satisfying the space-time symmetry condition, can be solved in a very simple way, with the help of the analogy between mechanics and optics, which was the starting point for the development of wave mechanics and which can still be used—with reservations—as a source of inspiration."

References

Bibliography of cited sources

Arnold, V.I. (1974/1978). Mathematical Methods of Classical Mechanics, translated by K. Vogtmann,  A. Weinstein, Springer, Berlin, .
Biggs, H.F. (1927). Wave Mechanics. An Introductory Sketch, Oxford University Press, London.
de Broglie, L. (1923). Waves and quanta, Nature 112: 540.
de Broglie, L., Recherches sur la théorie des quanta (Researches on the quantum theory), Thesis (Paris), 1924; de Broglie, L., Ann. Phys. (Paris) 3, 22 (1925). English translation by A.F. Kracklauer
Cohen, R.S, Stachel, J.J., editors, (1979). Selected papers of Léon Rosenfeld, D. Reidel Publishing Company, Dordrecht, .
Jammer, M. (1966). The Conceptual Development of Quantum Mechanics, MGraw–Hill, New York.
Frenkel, J. (1934). Wave mechanics. Advanced General Theory, Oxford University Press, London.
Kemble, E.C. (1937). The Fundamental Principles of Quantum Mechanics, with Elementary Applications, McGraw–Hill, New York.
Hamilton, W.R., (1834). On the application to dynamics of a general mathematical method previously applied to optics, British Association Report, pp. 513–518, reprinted in The Mathematical Papers of Sir William Rowan Hamilton (1940), ed. A.W. Conway, A.J. McConnell, volume 2, Cambridge University Press, London.
Lanczos, C. (1949/1970). The Variational Principles of Mechanics, 4th edition, University of Toronto Press, Toronto, .
Messiah, A. (1961). Quantum Mechanics, volume 1, translated by G.M. Temmer from the French Mécanique Quantique, North-Holland, Amsterdam.
Rosenfeld, L. (1971). Men and ideas in the history of atomic theory, Arch. Hist. Exact Sci., 7: 69–90. Reprinted on pp. 266–296 of Cohen, R.S, Stachel, J.J. (1979).
Schrödinger, E. (1926). An undulatory theory of the mechanics of atoms and molecules, Phys.  Rev., second series 28 (6): 1049–1070.
Schrödinger, E. (1926/1928). Collected papers on Wave Mechanics, translated by J.F. Shearer and W.M. Deans from the second German edition, Blackie & Son, London.
Schrödinger, E. (1928). Four Lectures on Wave Mechanics. Delivered at the Royal Institution, London, on 5th, 7th, 12th, and 14th March, 1928, Blackie & Son, London.
Synge, J.L. (1954). Geometrical Mechanics and de Broglie Waves, Cambridge University Press, Cambridge UK.

Hamiltonian mechanics
Quantum mechanics
Wave mechanics